The Eurovision Young Dancers 1997 was the seventh edition of the Eurovision Young Dancers, held at the Teatr Muzyczny in Gdynia, Poland on 17 June 1997. Organised by the European Broadcasting Union (EBU) and host broadcaster Telewizja Polska (TVP), dancers from seven countries participated in the televised final. A total of thirteen countries took part in the competition.  and  made their début while five countries (and ) withdrew from the contest. However, France, Switzerland and Norway broadcast the event and, for the first time, Ireland.

The participant countries could send one or two dancers, male or female, who performed one or two dances. The semi-final took place six days before the final (11 June 1997).

Spain, with Antonio Carmena San José, won the contest for a 5th time (4th in a row) with Belgium and Sweden placing second and third respectively.

Location

Teatr Muzyczny, a theatre in Gdynia, Poland, was the host venue for the 1997 edition of the Eurovision Young Dancers.

Format
The format consists of dancers who are non-professional and between the ages of 16–21, competing in a performance of dance routines of their choice, which they have prepared in advance of the competition. All of the acts then take part in a choreographed group dance during 'Young Dancers Week'.

Jury members of a professional aspect and representing the elements of ballet, contemporary, and modern dancing styles, score each of the competing individual and group dance routines. Once all the jury votes have been counted, the two participants which received the highest total of points progress to a final round. The final round consists of a 90-second 'dual', were each of the finalists perform a 45-second random dance-off routine. The overall winner upon completion of the final dances is chosen by the professional jury members.

Folk dance group "Bazuny" performed as the interval act.

Results

Preliminary round
A total of thirteen countries took part in the preliminary round of the 1997 contest, of which seven qualified to the televised grand final. The following countries failed to qualify.

Final
Awards were given to the top three countries. The table below highlights these using gold, silver, and bronze. The placing results of the remaining participants is unknown and never made public by the European Broadcasting Union.

Jury members 
The jury members consisted of the following:

  – Maya Plisetskaya (Head of Jury)
 / – Gigi Caciuleanu
  – Paola Cantalupo
  – Katarzyna Gdaniec
  – Uwe Scholz
  – Gösta Svalberg
  – Heinz Spoerli

Broadcasting
The 1997 Young Dancers competition was broadcast in 17 countries. France, Ireland, Norway, and Switzerland broadcast it in addition to the competing countries.

See also
 Eurovision Song Contest 1997

References

External links 
 

Eurovision Young Dancers by year
1997 in Poland
June 1997 events in Europe
Historical events in Poland